Antoine Houbrechts (born 6 September 1943) is a retired Belgian road racing cyclist, who competed professionally between 1965 and 1981. He won the 1967 Volta a Portugal and 1968 Vuelta a Andalucía, and rode the Tour de France in 1968, 1970, 1972, 1973 and 1975.

References 

1943 births
Living people
Belgian male cyclists
People from Tongeren
Cyclists from Limburg (Belgium)
Volta a Portugal winners
20th-century Belgian people